George A. Murrell House, also known as Oak Grove, is a historic home located near Napton, Saline County, Missouri. It was built in 1854, and is a two-story, Greek Revival style timber frame I-house with a two-story rear ell. It sits on a limestone block foundation and has a hipped roof. The front facade features a full-height front portico.

It was added to the National Register of Historic Places in 1997.

References

Houses on the National Register of Historic Places in Missouri
Greek Revival houses in Missouri
Houses completed in 1854
Buildings and structures in Saline County, Missouri
National Register of Historic Places in Saline County, Missouri